Amaanat is a 1994 Indian Hindi-language action film directed by Raj N. Sippy. It stars Akshay Kumar, Sanjay Dutt, Heera Rajagopal and Kanchan in pivotal roles.

Plot summary
In a small village having mostly aged people, there has not been any rainfall for the past 3 years. A youngster wanting to be the leader of the village has to free the village people from this calamity. The people of the village beg a rich master for water, but in vain. So the hero has to go to the city to buy a water tube. In the city, all his belongings including his money have been stolen. Then he rescues a guy who was getting beaten up by thieves. They become good friends and they help each other.

Cast
Sanjay Dutt as Vijay
Akshay Kumar as Amar   
Heera Rajagopal as Geeta
Kanchan as Radha
Farheen as Bijli
Mukesh Khanna as Agarwal Seth
Gulshan Grover as Niranjan
Kiran Kumar as Rajeshwar/ Lankeshwar
Navneet Nishan as Yasmin

Soundtrack

References

External links

1994 films
1990s Hindi-language films
1990s action drama films
Indian action drama films
Films about friendship
Films scored by Bappi Lahiri
1994 drama films
Hindi-language action films